The Victorian Railways (VR) of Australia and successors have utilised a number of different types of railway carriages and wagons for the supply of head end power to passenger trains on the Victorian railway network.

When train travellers around the world began to enjoy such comforts as lighting, and heating and cooling, the Victorian Railways initially employed axle mounted generators], then progressed to more reliable head-end power (HEP) as a source for this equipment. In more recent times, vans have been specially built for the purpose of supplying HEP, or special generators are fitted to locomotives (the N and P classes)

Victorian Railways, later V/Line

BP98

From 1961 to 1963, a single van was fitted with a generator set to provide power to passenger trains running between Melbourne and Albury on the new standard gauge route. The van was numbered BP98 and painted in blue with gold stripes to match the carriages.

A video of the vehicle in service is available online, timestamp 2:31 to 2:44 -

PH Vans

By the mid-1980s, passenger trains within Victoria almost always required head-end power (HEP), as the wooden cars were phased out. While a number of trains had self-contained generator supplies, the majority required HEP from outside sources. The N and P class locomotives were fitted with HEP generators, but if another locomotive were to haul the train, there would be no power supply for the carriages.

To this end, three louvre series vans were fitted with generator sets and cabling in 1984. The corrugated roofs were replaced with sheet metal. The vans were coded PH and numbered 451, 452 and 453. They were converted from VLPY freight wagons 139, 140 and 142 respectively, and appeared in a grey livery. PH451 had Super Service bogies fitted by 1995, PH452 sometime between 1991 and 1995, and PH453 in mid-1995. These vans are all in service on the broad gauge today, in a plain, dark blue livery. In late 2009/early 2010, PH 454 was converted from DN 404, and painted grey with a white stripe.

Private operators

PCP292 & 294

VZDY27

VZDY52, ZVDY52, BVDY52

ZVDY50

Victorian & New South Wales Joint Stock

PHN vans

The PHN class were Standard Gauge Joint Stock owned by the New South Wales Government Railways and VR. They were steel fluted sided vans, and ran between Melbourne and Sydney. Six were built from 1961 by Commonwealth Engineering, Sydney, three each for the Southern Aurora and Spirit of Progress numbered PHN 2361 - PHN 2363 and PHN 2369 - PHN 2371 respectively.

PHN 2370, destroyed in the Violet Town collision in 1969, was replaced by PHN 2381 built in 1970. In 1981, PHN 2362 and 2363 were renumbered 2862 and 2863 respectively.

In 2016, V/Line acquired NAM 2337 from the Hunter Valley Railway Trust, Rothbury for conversion to a fourth power van (with PCJ491, 492 and 493 ex PCO 1, 3 and 2) for standard gauge N set consists. V/Line did have the option of modifying an ex Overland CO luggage van, but that wasn't deemed practical. As of late 2016, the car is at Downer Rail's Newport Workshops being stripped and converted. (March 2017 Update: This Conversion of NAM2337 has reportedly now been stopped, (but the interior has already been stripped out)

Victorian & South Australian Joint Stock

PCO/PCJ vans

Notes

References
Peter J. Vincent: PHN - Joint Stock Power Van
Peter J. Vincent: PH - Head End Power Van
Peter J. Vincent: PCO/PCJ - Guard's Van with Head End Power Unit
V/LineCars: D Vans - Luggage vans
 *V/LineCars: D Van Image Gallery

Victorian Railways carriages